Staurothele pulvinata is a species of saxicolous (rock-dwelling), squamulose lichen in the family Verrucariaceae. The lichen was first formally described in 1861 by Theodor Magnus Fries, as a member of genus Endocarpon. The type specimen was collected from northern Norway. The taxon was later transferred to Dermatocarpon by Gustav Wilhelm Körber in 1863, and to Polyblastia by Antonio Jatta in 1900. Starri Heiðmarsson moved it to Staurothele in 2017, based on molecular phylogenetic analysis that showed it belonged to that genus. It is one of few squamulose species in a genus comprising mostly crustose lichens. Staurothele pulvinata has an arctic-alpine distribution; it has been recorded from Europe, Greenland, Iceland, and the United States.

References

Verrucariales
Lichen species
Lichens described in 1861
Taxa named by Theodor Magnus Fries
Lichens of Northern Europe
Lichens of Iceland
Lichens of Subarctic America